Eddie Cranage (12 June 1917 – 7 May 1993) was an  Australian rules footballer who played with St Kilda in the Victorian Football League (VFL).

Notes

External links 

1917 births
1993 deaths
Australian rules footballers from Victoria (Australia)
St Kilda Football Club players